The Olympic Primary School is a government-aided primary school in Kenya. It is Located in Kibera, a slum district in the capital Nairobi. This school was established in 1980. Over the years, the school was successful in national examinations and thus attracted pupils from all social classes, from millionaires families , middle-classes, working classes and the penniless slum dwellers.   

There was no school in the city matching the background of the roots of the pupils found here.   

The school is partly funded by the British government and consistently places near the top of Kenya's school league tables.

History 
The school received a visit from British Chancellor of the Exchequer Gordon Brown in January 2005. The visit aimed to learn about the effects of the 2003 introduction of free primary schooling.

There were some 1,700 students at the school prior to 2003. Some 5,000 students attempted to enroll at the time that school fees were abolished, but not all could be accommodated. Some disappointed persons became unruly and rioting almost broke out. 

As of 2005, enrollment is approximately 2,200.The introduction of 'free education' has in essence created further problems for the education sector since all the deep rotted issues in the sector were not addressed in detail but rather the government at the time introduced 'Free Education' as an appeasement to gain heavy political mileage from the poorer kenyan public that form the greater majority of the voters .

Political myths on school 

There were some 1,700 students at the school prior to 2003. Some 5,000 students attempted to enroll at the time that school fees were abolished, but not all could be accommodated. Some disappointed persons became unruly and rioting almost broke out. As of 2005,enrollment is approximately 2,200.The introduction of 'free education' has in essence created further problems for the education sector since all the deep rotted issues in the sector were not addressed in detail but rather the government at the time introduced 'Free Education' as an appeasement to gain heavy political mileage from the poorer kenyan public that form the greater majority of the voters.

References 
 Guardian.co.uk article of January 13, 63. STM BBC article] of January 8, 2003

Elementary and primary schools in Kenya
Schools in Nairobi
Educational institutions established in 1980
Public schools in Kenya